Julian Charles Marsham, 8th Earl of Romney (born 1948, of Gayton Hall), is an English peer.

Biography
Lord Romney is the son of Colonel Peter William Marsham (only son of Dame Joan Marsham) and a grandson of the 4th Earl of Romney and his wife, Hersey Coke, granddaughter of Thomas Coke, 2nd Earl of Leicester.

He was educated at Eton and became a land agent and farmer.

In 2007, Lord Romney served as High Sheriff of Norfolk.

Marriage and children
In 1975, Romney married Catriona Ann Stewart, the daughter of Robert Christie Stewart, by whom he has two sons and one daughter:

 Lieutenant Colonel David Charles Marsham, Viscount Marsham (born 18 April 1977); married Katherine F. Phillips, has issue.
 Hon. Michael Julian Marsham (born 3 March 1979) married Hon. Lucy Harriet Beaumont, daughter of Wentworth Peter Ismay Beaumont, 4th Viscount Allendale.
 Lady Laura Clare Marsham (born 18 March 1984), married James Meade, son of Olympian Richard Meade. Lady Laura is a godmother of Prince Louis, and James is a godfather of Princess Charlotte.

He succeeded his first cousin once removed, Michael Marsham, 7th Earl of Romney, in the earldom and the titles Baron Romney and Viscount Marsham in 2004.

References

1948 births
Living people
Earls in the Peerage of the United Kingdom
High Sheriffs of Norfolk
People educated at Eton College
People from King's Lynn and West Norfolk (district)